The 2014–15 Montenegrin First League was the ninth season of the top-tier football in Montenegro. The season began on 8 August 2014 and ended on 30 May 2015.

Teams 
Last season, Dečić were relegated to the Montenegrin Second League, finishing in 12th place and Čelik exclusion because of financial issues. Bokelj and Berane were promoted.

Stadia and locations 

All figures for stadiums include seating capacity only, as many stadiums in Montenegro have stands without chairs which would otherwise be the actual number of people able to attend football matches not regulated by UEFA or FIFA.

League table

Results
The schedule consisted of three rounds. During the first two rounds, each team played each other once home and away for a total of 22 matches. The pairings of the third round were then set according to the standings after the first two rounds, giving every team a third game against each opponent for a total of 33 games per team.

First and second round

Third round
Key numbers for pairing determination (number marks position after 22 games):

Relegation play-offs
The 10th-placed team (against the 3rd-placed team of the Second League) and the 11th-placed team (against the runners-up of the Second League) will both compete in two-legged relegation play-offs after the end of the season.

Summary

Matches

2–2 on aggregate. Mornar won 9–8 on penalties.

Dečić won 7–1 on aggregate.

Top goalscorers

Source: cg-fudbal.com

External links 
 Soccerway

Montenegrin First League seasons
Monte
1